Mexacarbate is a carbamate pesticide developed by Alexander Shulgin and marketed in 1961 by Dow Chemical Company under the trade name Zectran. As of 2009, mexacarbate is considered obsolete or discontinued, according to the World Health Organization. It is notable for being the first biodegradable pesticide.

References 

Carbamate insecticides
Phenol esters